The 1980 Lamar Cardinals football team represented Lamar University as a member of the Southland Conference during the 1980 NCAA Division I-A football season. The Cardinals played their home games at Cardinal Stadium now named Provost Umphrey Stadium in Beaumont, Texas. Lamar finished the 1980 season with a 3–8 overall record and a 1–4 conference record. One highlight for the season was the highest attended game in the history of the stadium. 18,500 fans attended the September 13 game against Baylor.

Schedule

References

Lamar
Lamar Cardinals football seasons
Lamar Cardinals football